Elanito "Lani" Alidon Peña (born March 22, 1962) is a Filipino politician from Minglanilla, Cebu, Philippines. He currently serves as the vice mayor of Minglanilla since 2022 and served from 2004 to 2013. Peña previously served as mayor along with former vice mayor Robert Selma and Loben Geonzon.

References

1962 births
Living people
Nacionalista Party politicians